Lawrence Alan Agran (born February 2, 1945) is an American lawyer and the former mayor and a current city councilmember of Irvine, California.

Early life 
Agran was born in Chicago, the son of Selma Elizabeth (Meyerson) and Reuben Agran (originally "Agranowsky"). He was raised in a "politically liberal Jewish household". Agran graduated Phi Beta Kappa from the University of California, Berkeley in 1966 with a Bachelor of Science degree in both history and economics. He then earned a juris doctor (with honors) from Harvard Law School in 1969, specializing in public interest law.

Agran served as legal counsel to the California State Senate Committee on Health and Welfare and taught legislation and public policy at the UCLA School of Law and the University of California, Irvine Graduate School of Management.

City government

Elected service between 1978 and 1990
Between 1978 and 1990, Larry Agran served on the Irvine City Council, including six years as mayor (Irvine employs a council-manager government). Larry Agran won the most votes in his first election for Irvine City Council on March 7, 1978, being elected to his first four-year term in Irvine's City Council.

Larry Agran won the most votes again in the regular municipal election on June 8, 1982, and first served as mayor of Irvine in 1982, continuing through 1984, with a second term starting in 1986. In 1988, Agran won the first-ever direct-election for mayor in Irvine's history. In 1990, Agran was recognized as an elected Democratic Socialists of America "DSAer" by Democratic Left magazine. He lost reelection in the subsequent 1990 mayoral election.

Municipal diplomacy
In 1983, then-Mayor Agran established the Local Elected Officials of America (LEO-USA) project, which founded what became a network of over 250 U.S. local officials advocating for municipal priorities that had an international scope, including the end of the arms race, reduction in U.S. defense spending, and the prioritizing of increased federal spending in economically disadvantaged American cities. Meanwhile, in 1982, the non-profit Center for Innovative Diplomacy (CID) was established in San Francisco by Michael Shuman to advocate for citizen diplomacy and local government action to end the nuclear arms race. The organizations prioritized support for the 1981 Nuclear Weapons Freeze Campaign. Eventually, the organizations aimed at broader diplomatic issues, including sanctuary cities and sister cities in Central America. In the last decade of the Cold War, the networks grew to over 6,000 local officials and activists. CID and LEO-USA merged, under the CID name, and its headquarters moved to Irvine. The merger was followed by the foundation of the Bulletin of Municipal Foreign Policy, a journal that focused on the "municipal foreign policy movement." In 2019, Agran worked with University of California, Irvine doctoral student Ben Leffel to chronicle the role Irvine had to play in establishing CID/LEO-USA its municipal foreign policy network, using original issues of the Bulletin, with articles largely written by the Center's expansive network.

In 1989, Agran implemented the first city-level CFC ban in the country (see below) and is credited with starting "the world’s largest international environmental city government network, ICLEI – Local Governments for Sustainability (formerly, International Council for Local Environmental Initiatives)." In September 2020, Larry Agran was recognized by ICLEI as playing a crucial role in founding the international organization that now includes over 1,750 cities, towns, and counties in 84 countries:

A digital archive was created at the University of California, Irvine of CID's work, as well as the founding of ICLEI.

Human rights ordinance
As Mayor in 1988, Larry Agran led Irvine's City Council to establish the first human rights ordinance of its kind in Orange County, prohibiting discrimination on basis of "race, color, religion, national origin, sex, age, marital status, physical handicap," as well as sexual orientation.  The city ordinance was patterned on state and federal law, but went further to protect against discrimination based on sexual orientation.  The Irvine City Council voted 4-0 to pass the ordinance.

In 1989, a ballot measure (Measure N), led by Christina Shea and her husband, struck "sexual orientation" as a protected class from the human rights ordinance.  In June 2020, the initiative was repealed by a unanimous vote of the Irvine City Council.

Municipal action on chlorofluorocarbons
Agran, Rowland and Molina, championed what was described as one of "the most far reaching measures" in banning commercial process and consumer product use of CFCs. The ordinance is recognized as jumpstarting municipal, state, national, and international efforts to craft legislation that banned CFCs.

Return to city government in 1998 
In 1998, Agran re-entered public service as an Irvine City Councillor.

He was again elected mayor in the 2000 election (in which he was unopposed), and in 2002. He later, unsuccessfully, sought the mayoralty in 2012.

Agran rejoined the city council in 2004 and has, for many years, served as a councilor, being most recently re-elected in 2020. He chaired the city's Great Park board until February 2011.

Orange County Great Park
As an Irvine City Councilmember, Agran was the chair of the board of directors of the Orange County Great Park project from 2004 to 2010, establishing an international Great Park Master Design Competition that selected landscape architect Ken Smith of New York to create a master design and plan for the 40-year build-out of the Great Park.

Agran supervised removal and clean-up of decades of toxic contamination and building of many of the Great Park's iconic features, including the Great Park Balloon and Carousel, the Palm Court and Arts Complex, the Farm + Food Lab, the South Lawn Soccer Complex, the huge North Lawn (the largest uninterrupted lawn in Southern California), and restoration and repurposing of historic World War II airplane hangars.  Under Agran's leadership, the Great Park also began hosting popular events, including Cirque du Soleil, concerts, movies, air shows, regular farmers markets, and countless other community events, boosting attendance at the Great Park to nearly one million annual visitors.  Under Agran's tenure, the City of Irvine and the Orange County Great Park also won a national U.S. Department of Energy competition to be the host venue for two U.S. Solar Decathlons, which were ultimately held at the Great Park in 2013 and 2015.  Annual financial audits of the Great Park conducted from 2004 through 2010 consistently found that the project was properly managed and that all spending was properly authorized, with no significant irregularities or unaccounted-for funds.

In 2012, the development of the Great Park became politicized. Political opponents of Agran — including newly-elected Mayor Steven Choi and Councilmembers Christina Shea and Jeff Lalloway — won a 3-2 majority on the City Council, and called for another audit of Great Park expenditures.  Agran and the other members of the City Council voted for the new audit, specifying that the cost should not exceed $250,000.  Councilmembers Christina Shea and Jeff Lalloway were appointed by the city council to a newly constituted City Council Subcommittee charged with overseeing the audit.  The committee hired an accounting firm to conduct the audit: Hagen, Streiff, Newton & Oshiro (HSNO).

In January 2014, HSNO issued a preliminary public report declaring that $38 million in Great Park funds were "missing." The funds were, in fact, sitting in a secure state-mandated housing set-aside account.

The budget for the Great Park audit increased from the original $250,000 that had been authorized to $1.7 million to conduct additional investigations into the Great Park.

These expenditures drew the attention of the Joint Legislative Audit Committee of the California State Legislature, which ordered California State Auditor Elaine Howle to conduct a careful review of the entire Great Park audit and the work of the Shea Subcommittee. That review culminated in California State Auditor Report 2015-116, titled "Poor Governance of the $1.7 Million Review of the Orange County Great Park Needlessly Compromised the Review's Credibility."  The California State Auditor's report states that the HSNO was hired through a flawed and biased selection process that "cast doubt on the impartiality of Irvine's selection of HSNO as the park review consultant and increased the risk that the city did not select the most qualified vendor to meet its needs."  This bidding process all but ensured that HSNO would receive a second, "no-bid" contract. The report is also critical of the Shea Subcommittee's failure to properly oversee the work of the outside firms hired to conduct the audit, noting that the audit itself was driven by political motivations rather than by an objective analysis of the readily-available financial data.

In January 2020, the accounting firm hired by the Shea Subcommittee — Hagen, Streiff, Newton & Oshiro (HSNO) — was ordered to surrender their accountancy license and paid $550,000 in costs and penalties when the California Board of Accountancy said that the firm "failed to comply with professional standards, engaged in numerous acts of negligence, and disseminated false and misleading information" in performing the Great Park audit.

Orange County Veterans Memorial Park and Cemetery Campaigns 
In July 2014, the Irvine City Council unanimously passed Councilmember Larry Agran's motion to transfer 125-acres of city-owned land called the Amended and Restated Development Agreement (ARDA) site to the state for development of a Veterans Memorial Park and Cemetery.

A concept plan for the development was released in June 2016. Estimated cost of the facility was $78 million. In April 2017, the Irvine City Council, on a split 3-2 vote, introduced a land-swap alternative with developer Five Point, trading the park-side ARDA site with a similarly sized location near Interstate 405. In June 2017, with another split 3-2 vote, Irvine City Council directed the City to enter the land swap contract with developer Five Point to move the cemetery.

After the Irvine City Council entered the land swap agreement on October 10, 2017, Irvine residents started a petition referendum campaign to halt the zoning ordinance change that was requisite for the land swap, submitting 19,140 signatures gathered within 30 days, which put the zoning change on the June 2018 ballot. The referendum to halt the zoning change was successful, as measure "B", which would have allowed the relocation of the cemetery, was defeated by 63% to 37%.

In July 2018, the Irvine City Council moved to study a third site for the veterans' cemetery, dubbed the "golf course site". Irvine residents initiated a petition initiative, led by Ed Pope and Larry Agran, to designate by zoning the ARDA site to be the only site in the Great Park area to be used for cemetery purposes. Proponents of the initiative to build at the original ARDA site submitted a reported 19,758 signatures to put the initiative on the November 2020 ballot. In May 2020, Irvine City Council voted 4-1 to adopt the initiative as ordinance, designating the ARDA site as the only site in the Great Park area for cemetery uses.

Presidential candidacy 

In 1992, Agran unsuccessfully sought the Democratic Party nomination for president. Agran was generally ignored by the media during his candidacy, a topic heavily covered in the 1995 Brian Springer documentary Spin. The media did not report his polling numbers even as he met or exceeded the support of other candidates such as Jerry Brown. Party officials excluded him from most debates on various grounds, even having him arrested when he interrupted to ask to participate. When he managed to join the other candidates in a forum, his ideas went unreported.

Despite holding only a local office and being unknown outside California, in a poll on January 22, 1992, he tied with two well-known national politicians: Senator Tom Harkin of Iowa and the former governor of his home state, Jerry Brown.

According to Carole Florman, organizer of the Global Warming Leadership Forum in Tallahassee in February (in which Agran participated), "the audience was more enthusiastic about Larry Agran than about Bill Clinton".

Agran performed poorly in the New Hampshire primary, but did pick up modest support in later primaries as a protest candidate with appeal to those unhappy with the other candidates. He received three votes at the 1992 Democratic National Convention.

Agran was excluded from every television debate, along with some other minor candidates, such as Eugene McCarthy.

Electoral history

Municipal

City Council, 2020
 Tammy Kim – 43,744 (14.8%) (elected)
 Mike Carroll – 38,615 (13.1%) (elected)
 Larry Agran – 38,156 (12.9%) (elected)
 Lauren Johnson-Norris – 37,931 (12.8%)
 John Park – 32,521 (11.0%)
 Carrie O'Malley – 27,440 (9.3%)
 Mark Newgent – 15,894 (5.4%)
 Diana Jiang – 14,837 (5.0%)
 Laura Bratton – 10,305 (3.5%)
 Dylan Green – 8,814 (3.0%)
 Christina Dillard – 8,321 (2.8%)
 Anshul Garg – 6,420 (2.2%)
 Abigail Pole – 6,406 (2.2%)
 Hai Yang Liang – 5,944 (2.0%)

City Council, 2014
 Lynn Schott – 16,814 (22.9%) (elected)
 Jeffrey Lalloway – 16,749 (22.8%) (elected)
 Melissa Fox – 16,539 (22.5%)
 Larry Agran – 14,403 (19.6%)
 Evan Chemers – 8,966 (12.2%)

Mayor of Irvine, 2012
 Steven S. Choi – 32,505 (45.7%) (elected)
 Larry Agran – 28,741 (40.4%)
 Katherine Daigle – 9,951 (13.9%)

Note: Larry Agran continued to serve on Irvine City Council as Councilmember through 2014

City Council, 2010
 Larry Agran – 22,206 (23.6%) (elected)
 Jeffrey Lalloway – 20,959 (22.3%) (elected)
 Lynn Schott – 18,630 (19.8%)
 Shiva Farivar – 17,657 (18.8%)
 Chris Moore – 8,259 (8.8%)
 Bijan Mazarji – 3,327 (3.5%)
 Yunus Aksoy – 3,037 (3.2%)

City Council, 2008
 Beth Krom – 36,924 (19.5%) (elected)
 Steven S. Choi – 28,886 (15.3%) (elected)
 Larry Agran – 28,157 (14.9%) (elected)
 Margie Wakeham – 22,669 (12.0%)
 Todd Gallinger – 22,423 (11.9%)
 Patrick A. Rodgers – 22,093 (11.7%)
 Eric Johnson – 11,022 (5.8%)
 Bea Foster – 10,877 (5.8%)
 Ruby Young – 3,697 (2.0%)
 Paris Merriam – 2,354 (1.2%)

Note: 3rd runner up elected to a two-year term for purpose of filling vacancy created
by Sukhee Kang’s election to Mayor

City Council, 2004
 Larry Agran – 25,210 (16.9%) (elected)
 Steven S. Choi – 25,052 (16.8%) (elected)
 Sukhee Kang – 24,642 (16.5%)
 Debbie Coven – 24,261 (16.2%)
 Mike House – 22,561 (15.1%)
 Greg Smith – 22,326 (14.9%)
 Mohsen Alinaghian – 5,336 (3.6%)

Mayor of Irvine, 2002
 Larry Agran – 19,886 (53.4%) (elected)
 Mike House – 17,358 (46.6%)

Mayor of Irvine, 2000
 Larry Agran – 34,905 (100.0%) (elected unopposed)

City Council, 1998
 Larry Agran – 14,434 (22.4%) (elected)
 Greg Smith – 13,004 (20.2%) (elected)
 Ned E. Kassouf – 10,452 (16.3%)
 Carolyn McInerney – 10,422 (16.2%)
 George Michael Gallagher – 6,655 (10.3%)
 Don Irvine – 4,662 (7.2%)
 Jack Wu – 2,902 (4.5%)
 Savvas Roditis – 1,776 (2.8%)

Mayor of Irvine, 1990
 Sally Anne Sheridan – 14,256 (51.2%) (elected)
 Larry Agran – 13,584 (48.8%)

Mayor of Irvine, 1988
 Larry Agran – 15,651 (57.0%) (elected)
 Barry J. Hammond – 8,707 (31.7%)
 Hal Maloney – 3,111 (11.3%)

Note: first directly elected Mayor of Irvine

City Council, 1986
 Larry Agran – 11,056 (27.9%) (elected)
 Ed Dornan – 10,737 (27.1%) (elected)
 Tom Jones – 5,513 (13.9%)
 Hal Maloney – 5,221 (13.2%)
 Jean Hobart – 2,822 (7.1%)
 Mary Aileen Matheis – 1,543 (3.9%)
 Gary Steven Bennett – 669 (1.7%)
 Scott Wellman – 607 (1.5%)
 Anthony R. Korba – 551 (1.4%)
 Betsy Scherr – 551 (1.4%)
 Clarence P. Becwar – 351 (0.9%)

City Council, 1982
 Larry Agran – 8,696 (27.5%) (elected)
 Barbara Wiener – 8,295 (26.2%) (elected)
 John Nakaoka – 5,875 (18.6%)
 Edward A. Dornan – 5,567 (17.6%)
 Bill Pozzi – 2,083 (6.6%)
 Marjorie Keiser – 1,142 (3.6%)

City Council, 1978
 Larry Agran – 2,742 (22.7%) (elected)
 Arthur W. Anthony – 2,423 (20.0%) (elected)
 Ellen G. Freund – 1,885 (15.6%) (elected)
 Robert L. “Bob” Moore – 1,859 (15.4%)
 C. Larry Hoffman – 1,818 (15.0%)
 Vivian Hall – 1,206 (10.0%)
 David Warren – 61 (0.5%)
 Jerry Shaw – 55 (0.5%)
 Carol Effenberger – 49 (0.4%)

Note: Offices in Irvine are formally nonpartisan.

Presidential

1992 Democratic National Convention (delegates)
 Bill Clinton – 3,372 (80.27%) 	
 Jerry Brown – 596 (14.19%)
 Paul Tsongas – 209 (4.98%)
 Robert P. Casey – 10 (0.24%)
 Patricia Schroeder – 8 (0.19%)
 Larry Agran – 3 (0.07%)
 Ron Daniels – 1 (0.02%)
 Al Gore –  1 (0.02%)
 Joe Simonetta 1 (0.02%)

1992 United States presidential election (Democratic primary)
 Bill Clinton – 10,482,411 (52.01%)
 Jerry Brown – 4,071,232 (20.20%)
 Paul Tsongas – 3,656,010 (18.14%)
 Unpledged – 750,873 (3.73%) 	
 Bob Kerrey – 318,457 (1.58%)
 Tom Harkin – 280,304 (1.39%)
 Lyndon LaRouche – 154,599 (0.77%)
 Eugene McCarthy – 108,678 (0.54%)
 Charles Woods – 88,948 (0.44%)
 Larry Agran – 58,611 (0.29%)
 Ross Perot – 54,755 (0.27%)
 Ralph Nader – 35,935 (0.18%)
 Louis Stokes – 29,983 (0.15%)
 Angus Wheeler McDonald – 9,900 (0.05%)
 J. Louis McAlpine – 7,911 (0.04%)
 George W. Benns – 7,887 (0.04%)
 Rufus T. Higginbotham – 7,705 (0.04%)
 Tom Howard Hawks – 7,434 (0.04%)
 Stephen Bruke – 5,261 (0.03%)
 Tom Laughlin – 5,202 (0.03%)
 Tom Shiekman – 4,965 (0.03%)
 Jeffrey F. Marsh – 2,445 (0.01%)
 George Ballard – 2,067 (0.01%)
 Ray Rollinson – 1,206 (0.01%)
 Lenora Fulani – 402 (0.00%)
 Douglas Wilder – 240 (0.00%)

Including write-in candidates.

See also
List of Democratic Socialists of America who have held office in the United States

References

External links 
 City of Irvine biography
 

1945 births
20th-century American politicians
21st-century American politicians
Greater Los Angeles Democratic Party politicians
Harvard Law School alumni
Living people
Mayors of Irvine, California
Democratic Socialists of America politicians from California
People from Irvine, California
Candidates in the 1992 United States presidential election
UC Berkeley College of Letters and Science alumni